Peter Wright (born 10 March 1970) is a Scottish professional darts player who plays in the Professional Darts Corporation (PDC), where he is currently ranked No. 2 in the world. Nicknamed "Snakebite", he is a two-time world champion, having won the PDC World Darts Championship in 2020 and 2022. He is also a World Matchplay champion and has been ranked as the World No. 1 in the PDC twice (both times occurring in 2022).

When he was 24, Wright qualified for the first round of the 1995 BDO World Darts Championship, but then stopped playing darts professionally, working instead as a builder and tyre fitter while competing in local darts leagues. He resumed his professional darts career in his late 30s, playing his first full schedule of PDC events in 2008. He qualified for his first PDC World Darts Championship in 2010, entered the top 16 for the first time in 2013, and reached his first world final in 2014, where he was runner-up to Michael van Gerwen. He won his first major PDC title at the 2017 UK Open; as of January 2022, he has won seven major PDC titles. He has hit one televised nine-dart finish, at the 2020 Premier League Darts.

Known for his flamboyant stage persona, Wright typically wears colourful attire, multicoloured Mohican hairstyles created by his hairdresser wife Joanne, and elaborate designs painted on his head. He is known for performing a sidestep dance before his matches to the song "Don't Stop the Party" by Pitbull.

Early life, BDO, and beginnings of PDC career
Born in Livingston, Scotland, to a 16-year-old single mother, Wright moved to London with his mother when he was three years old because she feared that her sisters would take her child away from her. Although he has lived in England ever since, he chooses to represent Scotland in sports. He stated that he first became interested in darts through watching players such as Cliff Lazerenko, Jocky Wilson, and Eric Bristow on TV in the early 1980s. He received a set of darts for his 13th birthday, but since his mother could not afford a dartboard, he initially threw them at trees. After some practice, he was able to beat his stepfather and his stepfather's friends. Within a few years, he was regarded as one of the most promising young players in London.

Wright competed at the 1995 BDO World Darts Championship, losing 3–1 in the first round to eventual champion Richie Burnett. He did not pursue a professional career afterward; instead, he worked as a builder and tyre fitter while playing in local darts leagues. He competed in the 2005 UK Open, where he lost 5–4 in the third round to Dave Smith. After he and his wife Joanne watched the inaugural Grand Slam of Darts on TV in 2007, and Wright mentioned that he had beaten some of the players who were competing in the event, Joanne encouraged him to pursue professional success in the sport. He first played a full schedule of Professional Darts Corporation events in 2008, although he had little success, winning just £1,200 in prize money.

PDC

20092010
2009 proved to be a much better year for Wright as he made his PDC televised debut at the 2009 Las Vegas Desert Classic where he was defeated 6–3 by Colin Lloyd in the first round. His good form on the PDC Pro Tour, helped by a semi-final showing in the Las Vegas Players Championship, earned him qualification for the 2009 World Matchplay. Wright played Terry Jenkins in the first round and lost 10–4. Further quarter-final and semi-final runs followed in Players Championship events to qualify for his first PDC World Championship, where he lost 3–1 in sets to Michael van Gerwen in the opening round.

In 2010, Wright also made his debut in the Players Championship Finals and lost in the first round 6–2 against Wes Newton. In April, he reached his first final on the PDC tour at the sixth UK Open Qualifier where he lost 6–2 to Phil Taylor. Wright was knocked out in the third round of the UK Open 9–7 by William O'Connor.

2011 season
Wright won a match at the World Championship for the first time in 2011 by beating Co Stompé 3–1 and then saw off Paul Nicholson to face defending champion Phil Taylor in the third round. Wright lost 4–1 and averaged a very respectable 96.56. He enjoyed a good run at the UK Open which was ended in the last 16 by Mark Hylton and played in his second World Matchplay where Simon Whitlock beat him 10–7 in the first round. Wright's first quarter-final appearance in a major event came at the European Championship with victories over John Part and Gary Anderson, before losing again to Whitlock this time 10–6. His form continued by reaching the final of the 18th Players Championship of the year and a 6–2 loss to Anderson. Wright defeated Denis Ovens 6–4 in the opening round of the Players Championship Finals but lost 8–6 to Wes Newton in the subsequent round.

2012 season
Wright was unable to repeat his 2011 run in the 2012 edition of the World Championship, as he lost 3–1 to Jelle Klaasen in the first round. Wright missed 11 consecutive darts at doubles in the first two sets of the match. Wright represented Scotland with Gary Anderson in the 2012 PDC World Cup of Darts and together they were beaten by South Africa in the second round, losing in a sudden-death leg. Wright defeated Andy Brown and former world champions John Part and Richie Burnett to reach the last 16 of the UK Open where he played Raymond van Barneveld. Wright led 8–6 and was on a 138 finish on his throw to advance to the quarter-finals and beat the Dutchman for the first time. He hit treble 20 with his first dart and then single 18 to leave 60, meaning single 20 with his last dart would have left double top for the win when he returned to the board. However, Wright hit another treble 20 to bust his score and went on to lose the match 9–8.

Wright won his first PDC ranking title in October 2012, at the 15th Players Championship of the year in Killarney, Ireland, where he beat Robert Thornton 6–1 in the final with a 107 average. After all 33 ProTour events of 2012 had been played, Wright was 17th on the Order of Merit, comfortably inside the top 32 who qualified for the Players Championship Finals. He beat Colin Lloyd and Wayne Jones, before losing to Kim Huybrechts 10–6 in the quarter-finals.

2013 season
At the 2013 World Championship Wright saw off Arron Monk 3–0 in the first round to set up a meeting with the second favourite for the tournament, Michael van Gerwen, who Wright described as "not good enough" before the match. Wright won the first two sets, but van Gerwen won 12 of the next 14 legs to triumph 4–2. In the eight UK Open Qualifiers during the early part of 2013, Wright was a losing quarter-finalist twice and a losing semi-finalist three times to be placed fourth on the Order of Merit. It was at the UK Open where Wright reached his first major PDC semi-final. He had impressive victories over Gaz Cousins (9–4), BDO number one Stephen Bunting (9–2), Steve West (9–4) and Adrian Lewis (10–6). He played Phil Taylor in the semis and was beaten 5–10, with Wright stating afterwards that he had played the player instead of the dart board and was tensing up and snatching darts. He set himself a goal of reaching the top 16 in the world rankings by the end of the year. Later in the month, Wright won his second career ranking title at the fifth Players Championship. He averaged an incredible 118.66 in beating Gary Anderson 6–0 in ten minutes in the quarter-finals and then saw off Kevin Painter 6–3 in the semis and Wes Newton 6–1 in the final. He lost 6–4 to Colin Lloyd in the first round of the European Championship and 13–3 to Michael van Gerwen in the second round of the World Matchplay. Wright reached the final of the German Darts Championship, but lost 6–2 to Dave Chisnall. He also lost to Chisnall in the final of the next event, the seventh Players Championship, having beaten van Gerwen 6–2 in the semi-finals. He picked up another appearance in a final at the tenth event but lost 6–3 to Raymond van Barneveld. At the World Grand Prix he lost 2–0 in sets to Wes Newton in the first round, but after the event he moved into the world's top 16 for the first time. This earned him a spot in the first staging of the Masters, a tournament exclusively for the top 16 on the Order of Merit, where he was defeated 6–2 by Van Gerwen in the opening round.

2014 season
Wright advanced to the third round of the 2014 World Championship, where he faced Michael Smith who had knocked out Phil Taylor in the previous round. Wright produced his then highest televised averaged of 105.07 but at one point was 3–2 behind, before winning six of the next seven legs to reach the quarter-finals of the event for the first time in his career. He trailed 2–0 early on against Wes Newton but rallied to level with the match eventually going into a deciding set. Wright missed four match darts at two legs to none up but eventually edged the contest with a 121 finish on the bull to face Simon Whitlock in the semi-finals. He outplayed Whitlock from the start and maintained his high level by averaging over 100 for the second time in the event and win 6–2. Wright lost 12 of the first 14 legs in the final against number two seed Michael van Gerwen, before winning two unanswered sets and then missed one dart to trail just 4–3. He went on to be 6–2 behind and again won two sets in a row, but missed two chances to extend the match into a 12th set as he was beaten 7–4. The runner-up's cheque of £100,000 was the highest of his career at that point and he rose to world number seven. He was named the Most Improved Player and PDPA Player of the Year at the PDC's Annual Awards in January.

Wright's exploits earned him a place in the Premier League for the first time and he started the campaign very strongly with victories over the likes of Taylor (7–4), Adrian Lewis (7–1) and Whitlock (7–3) to be top of the table between weeks four and six. Despite three defeats in a row in the middle of the season, Wright was in the play-off places until week 13 and he then battled to a 6–6 draw with Taylor to ensure he would have a chance of progressing in the final round of league matches. However, after other results had not gone his way he was guaranteed to finish fifth in the table before he had played and he ended the season with a 7–5 defeat against Van Gerwen. Wright won his third title carrying ranking points of his career at the ninth Players Championship by beating Justin Pipe 6–2. At the Dubai Duty Free Darts Masters, Wright eliminated Taylor 10–5 and Dave Chisnall 11–8 to reach the final, where Van Gerwen was once again the victor as he defeated Wright 11–7. Wright played in his second World Cup of Darts this year and first with Robert Thornton and they progressed to the quarter-finals where they played Northern Ireland's Brendan Dolan and Michael Mansell. Wright lost his singles match 4–2 to Dolan, but Thornton saw off Mansell to send the tie into a deciding doubles game which Scotland lost 4–1. At the European Darts Open, Wright averaged 111.29 whilst beating Michael Smith 6–1 in the second round and he went on to reach the final where he won his first European Tour title by defeating Simon Whitlock 6–2. He also advanced to the final of the last Players Championship of the year, but lost 6–5 to Gary Anderson.

2015 season
Wright had a largely trouble free passage into the quarter-finals of the 2015 World Championship as he dropped just one set in his opening three games. However, he was second best against Gary Anderson in a 5–1 defeat. A 9–1 victory over Raymond van Barneveld at the UK Open marked Wright's first ever win over the Dutchman with Wright going on to meet Phil Taylor in the quarter-finals. Wright won 10–6 after producing a match defining run to go from 5–4 behind to 9–5 ahead and broke down in tears in the post match interview. He recomposed himself to thrash Stephen Bunting 10–0 with an average of 105.10, over 20 points higher than his opponent's. However, a victory over a fifth world champion in the tournament proved a step too far as he couldn't quite reach the same heights in the final against Michael van Gerwen in an 11–5 defeat. A week later, Wright lost 6–5 to James Wade in the final of the second Players Championship event. On his return to Scotland, Wright recovered from 5–1 down to steal a point against Stephen Bunting in the Premier League, stretching his run to five matches unbeaten. However, four of those games were draws and Wright went into the ninth week of fixtures needing a win over Adrian Lewis to avoid being relegated from the competition, but he was beaten 7–4. Wright threw the first nine-dart finish of his career during his run to the final of the seventh Players Championship and won the title by defeating Wade 6–5 with an average of 110.14. He also won the 12th event by overcoming Jelle Klaasen 6–1 in the final. Wright and Anderson beat the Dutch duo of Van Gerwen and Van Barneveld in a doubles match in the semi-finals of the World Cup to ensure Scotland would reach their first final in the event. They played England's Taylor and Lewis and it went to the final singles game in which the winner of Wright against Lewis would win the title, with Lewis triumphing 4–1. In the inaugural Japan Darts Masters, Wright advanced to the final by edging past Van Gerwen 8–7 with a 141 finish. He was 7–2 down to Taylor, but then produced three ton-plus finishes during a five leg burst to level the match. However, Taylor was first to a double in the deciding leg to inflict Wright's fourth defeat in a televised final.

Wright reset his highest televised average to 108.13 whilst eliminating Kim Huybrechts 10–5 in the opening round of the World Matchplay. A pair of straight forward wins over Andrew Gilding and Gerwyn Price saw him reach the semi-finals of the event for the first time, but he lost 17–12 to Van Gerwen. Terry Jenkins defeated Wright 6–4 in the final of the 15th Players Championship. He led Kim Huybrechts 5–2 in the final of the European Darts Grand Prix, before losing four successive legs to be defeated 6–5, missing one championship dart in the process. Wright won his third Players Championship title of the year by edging Benito van de Pas 6–5 with all 11 legs going with the throw. He lost each of the first five legs to Van Gerwen in the semi-finals of the European Championship, but then pulled it back to 8–7 behind. However, Wright missed two darts at a single number to set up a double to level and went on to lose 11–7. The pair would meet once more in the final of the first World Series of Darts Finals and this time Wright lost the game's opening four legs, before moving 5–4 up. At 10–9 ahead and one leg away from the title, Wright hit a 180 to leave 90 only for Van Gerwen to take out 129 on the bull and, after Wright was unable to checkout 121 in the final leg, Van Gerwen finished 50 to complete an 11 dart leg and deny Wright his first televised title.

2016 season
Wright did not drop a set in reaching the third round of the 2016 World Championship and survived one match dart from Dave Chisnall to win 4–3. He missed one dart against Adrian Lewis to reduce his deficit to 4–3 in the quarter-finals and lost 5–2. Wright reached the final of the UK Open for the second year in a row and just like 12 months previously he faced Michael van Gerwen. He stayed with Van Gerwen early on by only trailing 5–3 and missed a dart for a nine-dart finish, but Wright would ultimately lose 11–4. A week later Wright won the first Players Championship of 2016 by recovering from 5–3 down to Lewis to triumph 6–5. At the end of March, Wright reached the final of the German Darts Masters losing 6–4 to Van Gerwen.

Wright missed out on a Premier League finals spot by two points. A subsequent fallout on social media between Wright's wife Jo, Adrian Lewis and members of the management team of Gary Anderson led Wright to withdraw from the Scottish World Cup of Darts team, for whom he had represented in the previous years final, and was replaced by Robert Thornton.
Wright returned to PDC major televised action by reaching the quarter-finals of the World Matchplay after impressive 10–5 and 11–6 wins over Joe Cullen and Ian White respectively, before losing narrowly 16–14 to Lewis. He was edged out 6–5 by Van Gerwen in the final of the European Darts Open and the pair met in a European Tour final for the third time this year at the European Darts Grand Prix, with the world number one triumphing once again this time 6–2. Wright lost 2–0 to Brendan Dolan in the first round of the World Grand Prix, but reached the semi-finals of the European Championship and was ousted 11–8 by Mensur Suljović.

From 10–8 up in the semi-finals of the World Series of Darts Finals, Phil Taylor missed a total of seven match darts as Wright sneaked through to his seventh televised final and second in a row in this event 11–10. Once again Van Gerwen waited and Wright rallied from 10–6 to trail 10–9, but then missed five chances to level the game and was beaten 11–9. It was a similar story at the Grand Slam as Wright went 5–0 up on Taylor in the quarter-finals and knocked him out 16–10, missing a dart at double 12 for a nine darter along the way. In the semi-finals he lost to Van Gerwen for the 16th time in a row as the Dutchman averaged 111.17 to Wright's 102.13 in a 16–10 win. However, Wright, who so often changes his darts, stated that he had found a set he would be finally be staying with. Another semi-final exit followed at the Players Championship Finals as Dave Chisnall beat him 11–8.

2017 season: First major title
Wright averaged over 100 in each of his three matches at the 2017 World Championship leading up to a quarter-final meeting with James Wade in which he averaged even higher at 104.79. He closed out the match with a 134 finish to win 5–3 and move on to a semi-final against Gary Anderson. Wright battled to 3–3 having trailed 3–1, but lost nine of the final ten legs to be defeated 6–3. His current world ranking of three is the highest he has ever been. Wright won the first UK Open Qualifier of the year by beating Adrian Lewis 6–4 in the final and took the third event with a 6–5 win over Michael Smith in the final.
He made it three wins out of six events by defeating James Wade 6–3 in the final of the last qualifier to top the UK Open rankings.

Wright produced the second highest televised three-dart average of all-time of 119.50 in a 7–2 victory over Lewis in the fifth week of the Premier League. At the end of the same week he played in the UK Open, where he was the bookmakers' pre-tournament favourite due to his strong form and the absence of an injured van Gerwen. He defeated James Richardson, Dave Chisnall, and Rob Cross in the first two days of the tournament. From the quarter-final stage he beat Raymond van Barneveld 10–8 (with an average of 110.88) and Daryl Gurney 11–5 to play in the final of the event for the third year in a row. Wright raced into a 7–2 lead over Gerwyn Price and held on to claim his first major title with an 11–6 win. Wright won the German Darts Championship by overcoming Van Gerwen 6–3 in the final. It was his first victory over the world number one in a final after Wright had lost 10 in a row. He also added the German Darts Open to his growing collection of tournament wins after edging out Benito van de Pas 6–5 in the final by taking out a 121 finish with his opponent waiting on seven. He quickly made it a hat-trick of European Tour tournament wins this year when he whitewashed Van Gerwen 6–0 in the final of the European Darts Grand Prix.

Wright came close to topping the Premier League table as he finished a point behind Van Gerwen. Nevertheless, he qualified for the play-offs for the first time and was 4–0 ahead of Taylor in the semi-finals. Wright still had to rely on Taylor missing darts at doubles including one to win the match and edged through 10–9. He also had a fast start in the final to be 7–2 up on Van Gerwen, before being pegged back to 8–8. At 10–9 Wright was one leg away from winning. He left 32 after nine darts, before missing six darts for the title. Wright still had the throw in the next leg, but Van Gerwen had a 12-dart leg to break and win 11–10. Despite this disappointment, two days later Wright won the 11th Players Championship by overcoming Daryl Gurney 6–3. Wright and Gary Anderson suffered a surprise first round 5–2 defeat to Singapore at the World Cup.

Wright reached the finals of the 2017 World Matchplay and the 2017 Grand Slam of Darts losing to Phil Taylor and Michael van Gerwen respectively. He won his first title on the World Series of Darts at the 2017 German Darts Masters, beating Taylor 11–4 in the final.

2018 season

Wright had an early exit in the 2018 World Championship, losing to Jamie Lewis in the second round. He only finished 7th in the 2018 Premier League Darts, but turned his season round by reaching the final of the 2018 PDC World Cup of Darts, alongside Gary Anderson, losing to the Netherlands team.

Wright followed his World Cup final appearance with a semi-final place at the 2018 World Matchplay and a win at the 2018 Melbourne Darts Masters. He also reached the finals of the 2018 World Grand Prix and the 2018 Champions League of Darts, losing to Michael van Gerwen and Gary Anderson respectively.

2019 season: World Cup Champion

At the 2019 World Championship, Wright again suffered an early exit, losing 3–1 to Spaniard Toni Alcinas in the second round. He finished the 2019 Premier League Darts season in 8th, only beating Raymond van Barneveld and contender Steve Lennon over the season. The Scotland team of Wright and Gary Anderson won the 2019 PDC World Cup of Darts, beating Ireland in the final.  Wright subsequently won the 2019 German Darts Masters, beating Gabriel Clemens in the final.

Wright made the final of the 2019 Champions League of Darts, and at one point led the first-of-eleven match against Michael van Gerwen 10–7, but he missed three match darts and allowed Van Gerwen to win 11–10. Wright also made the final of the 2019 Grand Slam of Darts, losing 16–6 to reigning champion Gerwyn Price.

2020 season: World, Masters and European Champion

At the 2020 World Championship Wright survived a match dart at bullseye to win a sudden-death leg against Noel Malicdem in the second round, before beating Seigo Asada and Jeffrey de Zwaan to reach the quarter-finals, where he triumphed 5–3 over Luke Humphries to reach the semi-final for the first time since the 2017 tournament. In a bad-tempered affair,  Wright defeated Gerwyn Price 6–3 in the semi-final and defeated Michael van Gerwen 7–3 in the final to become the 2020 World Darts Champion at the age of 49. On 2 February Peter Wright beat Michael Smith 11–10 to win his first Masters title. In November, Wright won his 4th major by beating James Wade 11–4 in the final of the European Championship. Wright had a poor showing at the Grand Slam, failing to progress from the group stage after a 2–5 loss to Devon Petersen in his final match, later stating "When I lost to Devon I could have walked away from the sport quite easily." Wright had better luck the following week with a run to the semi-finals of the Players Championship Finals making him just the third player in history (after Michael van Gerwen and Phil Taylor) to exceed £1,000,000 on the PDC Order of Merit.

2021 season: World Matchplay Champion and Players Championship Finals winner

Wright kicked off the defence of his world title by beating Steve West in his opening match of the 2021 World Championship, dressed in a Grinch costume. His reign as world champion came to an end in the third round, when he was defeated 4–3 by Gabriel Clemens.

In July, Wright won the World Matchplay title for the first time with a dominance performance whereby he won all five of his matches by a minimum of six legs and averaged over 100 throughout. He defeated Danny Noppert, Joe Cullen, Michael Smith, Michael van Gerwen and finally defending champion Dimitri van den Bergh. He followed this up with a second world cup win for Scotland, this time partnering John Henderson. A dry period including a first round loss to Rob Cross at the Grand Prix ended with a third Grand Slam of Darts final, beating Jose de Sousa, Fallon Sherrock and Michael Smith in the knockout rounds (the latter being a 16–12 win from 8–12 behind) before once again losing to Gerwyn Price. The following week, Wright won his first Players Championship Finals title, following comfortable wins over van Gerwen and Jonny Clayton with a deciding leg victory over Ryan Searle in the final. This completed Wright's set of reaching the final of every active PDC major and was his fifth win in two years.

2022 season: Second World Championship, World Number 1
Wright started his 2022 World Championship campaign with a convincing 3–0 win against Ryan Meikle, before fighting back from 2–0 down to defeat Damon Heta 4–2 in the third round. He next beat Ryan Searle 4–1, before coming back from 4–3 down to beat Callan Rydz in extra legs to make the semi-final. There he beat Gary Anderson 6–4 to reach the final for the third time in his career. Wright defeated Michael Smith 7–5 in the final to win his second world title. In the Masters, Wright suffered an early exit, losing 10-8 to Simon Whitlock in the round of 16. In the UK Open, he defeated Joe Cullen 10-6 in the fourth round before convincingly beating Simon Whitlock 10-5. However, his tournament would come to an end after losing 10-7 to William O'Connor after many missed doubles. On the 7th of March, Wright became the PDC World Number 1 for the first time, becoming the 11th player to do so and the oldest ever first time world number 1 at 51 years old. In the Premier League, Wright would finish 5th in the league table, meaning he did not qualify for the play-offs after only winning 1 night in the league stage. In the World Cup of Darts, alongside John Henderson, the pair defeated Hong Kong 5-1 in the opening round, before overcoming Portugal 2-0 in the round of 16, with Wright himself scraping past José de Sousa 4-3 to secure the victory, although Scotland would go on to lose 2-0 to England in the quarter-finals, with Wright himself losing 4-1 to James Wade. On 13 November, Peter's wife, Joanne, was rushed to hospital, following complications from surgery to remove her gallbladder and a hysterectomy. 

Following the conclusion of the Grand Slam of Darts tournament, Wright withdrew from the Players Championship Finals, in order to be with his wife.

Wright announced that Jo was left in severe pain, suffered a collapsed lung, which was apparently caused by a slit in the bile duct, which was causing fluid to leak, and her health deteriorated, following the surgery.

She spent 13 days in hospital, before finally being discharged on 26 November.

However, less than 2 days later, Wright announced on his Twitter page, that she had been taken into hospital again, and were awaiting to be admitted to a ward.

2023

At the 2023 World Championship, Wright opened his defence with a 3–0 win over Mickey Mansell. His defence ended when he lost 4–1 to Kim Huybrechts in the third round. On the 12 January, in the inaugural Bahrain Darts Masters, he defeated Toru Suzuki 6-3 in the opening round, before losing a last-leg decider to Rob Cross in the quarter-finals, but the next week he went on to win the Nordic Darts Masters for the first time beating Gerwyn Price in the final 11-5.

Style and stage persona
Wright has become known for his colourful Mohican hairstyle and extravagant clothing which change between every round of his tournaments. His hair takes two hours to complete and is done by his hairdresser wife Joanne and inspired by their daughter. He usually has a snake painted on to the side of his head which many believed was reference to his favourite drink, the snakebite, which is also Wright's nickname. However, he is actually called Snakebite due to his love of snakes, stating in an interview after his first World Championship win, "I just like snakes. I'm a bit like a snake – I'm a quiet person who likes to be left alone. If you keep poking me, I'll bite you," he said.

Wright equates his look to applying war paint before going into battle, as he is naturally shy away from the oche. In the past he has used specially designed darts which changed colour depending on the light. Wright is known to regularly try different sets of darts as he tweaks the weight, flights and stems. He did so between every round when he reached the 2014 World Championship final.

Wright performs a sidestep dance across the whole stage to Pitbull's "Don't Stop the Party" at the beginning of his matches. He regularly pauses on the third dart of leg winning doubles and moves away from the oche to encourage the crowd to make more noise upon his return. In a Premier League match he bent his knees to lower his height by about a foot to throw an exhibition dart. Such acts of showmanship have created negative reactions among his fellow professionals with world champions Adrian Lewis and Michael van Gerwen calling it disrespectful. Wright has stated that his job is to entertain spectators and would continue playing in the same manner.

World Championship performances

BDO
 1995: First round (lost to Richie Burnett 1–3)

PDC
 2010: First round (lost to Michael van Gerwen 1–3)
 2011: Third round (lost to Phil Taylor 1–4)
 2012: First round (lost to Jelle Klaasen 1–3)
 2013: Second round (lost to Michael van Gerwen 2–4)
 2014: Runner-up (lost to Michael van Gerwen 4–7)
 2015: Quarter-finals (lost to Gary Anderson 1–5)
 2016: Quarter-finals (lost to Adrian Lewis 2–5)
 2017: Semi-finals (lost to Gary Anderson 3–6)
 2018: Second round (lost to Jamie Lewis 1–4)
 2019: Second round (lost to Toni Alcinas 1–3)
 2020: Winner (beat Michael van Gerwen 7–3)
 2021: Third round (lost to Gabriel Clemens 3–4)
 2022: Winner (beat Michael Smith 7–5)
 2023: Third round (lost to Kim Huybrechts 1–4)

Career finals

PDC major finals: 20 (7 titles, 13 runners-up)

PDC world series finals: 7 (4 titles, 3 runners-up)

PDC team finals: 4 (2 titles, 2 runners-up)

Performance timeline

BDO

PDC

PDC European Tour

Nine-dart finishes

High averages

References

External links

 

Scottish darts players
English darts players
1970 births
Living people
Professional Darts Corporation current tour card holders
PDC world darts champions
Sportspeople from Livingston, West Lothian
Sportspeople from Suffolk
Anglo-Scots
World Series of Darts winners
UK Open champions
European Championship (darts) champions
Masters (darts) champions
World Matchplay (darts) champions
Players Championship Finals champions
Darts players who have thrown televised nine-dart games
PDC World Cup of Darts Scottish championship team